Siegfried Fisi'ihoi (born 8 June 1987) is a Tongan rugby union player. He plays in the prop position for the France based Top 14 side, Stade Français. Fisi'ihoi also represents Tonga at international level.

Early career
Born in Tonga, Fisi'ihoi moved to New Zealand in his teens and attended Rotorua Boys' High School where he initially played his rugby as a number eight. He stayed in the Bay of Plenty after school and was playing for their development side in 2010 when a minor liquor ban breach flagged up that he had overstayed his visa and he was subsequently deported back to Tonga.   He was able to return to New Zealand the following year and played club rugby for Rotoiti while also having a spell playing for East Coast in the Heartland Championship.

Senior career

Something of a late bloomer, Fisi'ihoi's first experience of senior provincial rugby came at the age of 27 when he made the Bay of Plenty squad for the 2014 ITM Cup.

Super Rugby

Solid domestic performances for the Bay of Plenty in 2014 and 2015 saw him named in the  wider training group ahead of the 2016 Super Rugby season. Injuries to fellow props Nepo Laulala and Pauliasi Manu meant that he got plenty of game time during his first year in Hamilton. As a reward for his displays throughout the season, he was promoted to the Chiefs senior squad for 2017.

Super Rugby Statistics

References

External links
 
 

1987 births
Tongan rugby union players
Tongan people of German descent
Bay of Plenty rugby union players
Chiefs (rugby union) players
Rugby union props
Tongan emigrants to New Zealand
People from Vavaʻu
Living people
People educated at Rotorua Boys' High School
East Coast rugby union players
Tonga international rugby union players